The men's singles tennis event of the 2011 Pan American Games was held from October 17–22 at the Telcel Tennis Complex in Guadalajara. The defending Pan American Games champion was Flávio Saretta of Brazil.

Seeds

Draw

Finals

Top half

Section 1

Section 2

Bottom half

Section 3

Section 4

References

Men's Singles